Gerald Degaetano (12 January 1964 - 8 January 2018) was a Maltese middle-distance runner who in 1989 won Malta's first medal at the Games of the Small States of Europe.

References

1964 births
2018 deaths
1989 Games of the Small States of Europe
Maltese male middle-distance runners